Charles Victor Sederman (9 January 1881 – 9 September 1952) was a British gymnast who competed in the 1908 Summer Olympics. He was born in Nailsea and died in Cardiff. A member of the Welsh national gymnastic team from 1906 until 1909, he also played rugby for Penarth and was a founder and secretary of the Welsh Amateur Boxing Association. He was a boxing judge at the 1948 Summer Olympics in London.

References

External links
 

1881 births
1952 deaths
Boxing judges
British male artistic gymnasts
Olympic gymnasts of Great Britain
Gymnasts at the 1908 Summer Olympics
People from Nailsea
British male boxers